Milton Resnick (January 7, 1917 – March 12, 2004) was an American artist noted for abstract paintings that coupled scale with density of incident. It was not uncommon for some of the largest paintings to weigh in excess three hundred pounds, almost all of it pigment. He had a long and varied career, lasting about sixty-five years. He produced at least eight hundred canvases and eight thousand works on paper and board.

He also wrote poetry on a nearly daily basis for the last thirty years of his life. He was an inveterate reader, riveting speaker and gifted teller of tales, capable of conversing with college audiences in sessions that might last three hours.

Paintings held in public collections include: New Bride, 1963 Smithsonian American Art Museum, Washington, D.C., Mound, 1961 National Gallery of Art, Washington, D.C., Saturn, 1976 National Gallery of Canada, Ottawa, Ontario, Elephant, 1977 Milton Resnick and Pat Passlof Foundation, New York, Earth, 1976 Museum of Modern Art, NYC, Wedding, 1962 The Metropolitan Museum of Art, New York, Pink Fire, 1971 National Gallery of Australia, Canberra, and Untitled, 1982 Whitney Museum of American Art, New York, along with many pictures of comparable quality in smaller collections — public and private — make for some, an effective case for Resnick as an exponent of the sublime.

His remaining estate is held in trust by the Milton Resnick and Pat Passlof Foundation. Beginning in 2017, the centenary of his birth, the Foundation plans to open his former residence and studio, at 87 Eldridge Street in Manhattan as a public exhibition space to showcase his work, that of his wife Pat Passlof, and other Abstract Expressionist painters.

Childhood 

Milton Resnick was born of Jewish parentage in the village of Bratslav, now in Ukraine. His given name was Rachmiel. Both his parents came from wealthy families: the Resnicks builders and the Mutchniks flour merchants. In the immediate aftermath of the Russian Revolution, Bratslav was repeatedly terrorized by Cossack gangs and the town—like so many others—decimated. Under duress, Resnick's father abandoned his business and property, and emigrated along with his wife's family to America in 1922. They settled in Brooklyn where Milton Resnick lived for the next ten years.

Disobeying his father, the boy left home at seventeen to become an artist. In order to survive he sold his blood, modeled, and worked at the American Artists School, 131 West 14th Street, as the elevator boy, in exchange for tuition. In 1938 Resnick met Willem de Kooning, likely introduced to him by his sweetheart, Elaine Fried. She married de Kooning in 1943. Resnick was enrolled in the Federal Art Project of the WPA in 1939. He became immersed in the art world after meeting many of the artists at Stewart's cafeteria, where they would congregate after collecting their WPA checks. Drafted into the army in 1940, he served in Iceland, Normandy, Northern Europe and the Rhineland. In 1945 at the age of twenty-eight, Resnick was finally discharged from the armed forces. Willem De Kooning, a faithful friend, had stored some of his art for that period. The rest was lost.

Early Years: Abstract Expressionism 

Resnick spent two years painting in Paris (August 1946 – 1948). His studio, at 21 Rue de Seine, was fortuitously located for engaging post-war French art. There he befriended the artist Wols, who lived next door. He also met Giacometti, Gruber, as well as dealers Katia Granoff and Pierre Loeb. He observed Artaud, Matisse, Picasso, and Derain at close range, and spent an afternoon with Brancusi in his studio. John Graham visited him there several times.

Resnick was one of the founding members of the artist's club, known simply as 'The Club,' in 1949. It became known as the den of what was later to be called the Abstract Expressionists. Other founding members included Franz Kline, Willem de Kooning, Ad Reinhardt, and Jack Tworkov. The Club became famous, a venue for intellectuals and luminaries like Dylan Thomas, Hannah Arendt, John Cage, Joseph Campbell, Buckminster Fuller, Paul Goodman, William Barrett, Edgar Varese and the young Pierre Boulez. In 1951 he participated in the 9th Street Art Exhibition, the first of many organized group exhibitions of Abstract Expressionism in New York City.

After a 1949 debut exhibit at Charles Egan Gallery was cancelled, due to a dispute over missing paintings, Resnick did not have a solo show until 1955. As a consequence, his reputation was compromised for several decades. Labeled a second generation Abstract Expressionist, his immersion in the Abstract Expressionist idiom directly after the war remained unacknowledged.

Resnick's public reputation increased through the late 1950s and early 1960s. With the new decade, his work, previously characterized by muscular, sometimes chunky interlocking forms that seemed to function as a byproduct of a generalized aggressive attack, began to be replaced with a less fraught, loose and dispersive handling of paint. His paintings simultaneously began to assume a massive size, the largest of which, 'Swan' (1961) reached 25 feet in length.

In 1961 he married Pat Passlof, an accomplished painter and former private pupil of de Kooning. For the greater part of their forty-four year long marriage, they lived apart but nearby each other.

Maturity 

With the rise of Pop Art and optical painting, not to mention Neo-Dada and Conceptualism, Resnick withdrew somewhat from the art world. Increasingly tending his own garden, he turned inward and began to produce—in complete disregard and perhaps defiance—the dense and rigorous all-over abstractions that would make his reputation. An indefatigable worker, these paintings often took months to accomplish before they were realized to his satisfaction.

In 1971 he was awarded a large scale exhibition featuring paintings from 1958 to 1970 at the Fort Worth Art Center Museum in Texas. It traveled to the Milwaukee Art Center later that year. In 1985 the Contemporary Arts Museum Houston mounted a retrospective exhibition. He also taught during these years, serving in a visiting capacity at several universities, but never joined any faculty.

In 1976 he bought a synagogue on the lower East Side of Manhattan—an earlier one being turned over to his wife—and lived and worked in it until his death in 2004.

Later life 

In the 1980s along with many canvases, he painted more than one hundred and forty small abstractions on stiff planks of cardboard. In 1986 he started to introduce into his pictures proto-human figures often in a cruciform or slingshot gestalt, and nearly interchangeable with his sign for a tree. They remained largely abstract in feeling and tone. No inviting space beckons the viewer nor compromises the quite distinctive agitation of the surface that, along with a preference for mineralized color, characterizes much of Resnick's work for the last forty years of his life.

He also painted numerous strange hermetic insignia's. The X, a sign of negation, frequently decomposed into two elbows that often didn't align properly.  The attitude towards symmetry and order remained light-heartedly derisive. He always maintained that ideas and narratives were just grist for his mill; nothing more. Content had no significance to him other than to provide an occasion to paint. He didn't generate ideas but made use of them as a subject if it pleased him to. Much of the late work was painted on rag or mold made paper, often with acrylic or gouache. His written poetry became increasingly important to him in the last ten years of his life.

Milton Resnick took his life in March 2004.

References

Bibliography
 Works of the 1960s and 1970s: Frieze Masters, 2012,  (New York: Cheim & Read, 2012.)
 Philip Larratt-Smith, The Elephant in the Room: Paintings from the 1960s to 1980s,  (New York: Cheim & Read, 2011.) .
 Nathan Kernan, Milton Resnick, A Question of Seeing, Paintings 1959–1963, (New York: Cheim & Read, 2008.) .
 Geoffrey Dorfman, Out of the Picture, Milton Resnick and the New York School, (New York: Midmarch Arts Press, 2003.) .
 Marika Herskovic, American Abstract Expressionism of the 1950s An Illustrated Survey, (New York: New York School Press, 2003.) . p. 282-285.
 Marika Herskovic, New York School Abstract Expressionists Artists Choice by Artists, (New York: New York School Press, 2000.) . p. 12; p. 16; p. 38; p. 302-305.

External links
 The Milton Resnick and Pat Passlof Foundation
 Milton Resnick, Cheim & Read Gallery, New York City
 Ken Johnson, "An Abstract World That Looks Like Silence: Milton Resnick Exhibition at Mana Contemporary," The New York Times, July 24, 2014.
 Geoffrey Dorfman, "Milton Resnick: Painting to Live," Painters' Table, April 30, 2014.
 Penelope Green, "His and Hers Synagogues on the Lower East Side," The New York Times, October 5, 2011.
 David Reed, "The Unsettling Mark," Art in America, August 27, 2011.
 Sharon Butler, "Resnick's Resonance," Two Coats of Paint, June 10, 2008.
 Thomas Micchelli, "Milton Resnick: A Question of Seeing," The Brooklyn Rail, June 7, 2008.
 David Cohen, "Milton Resnick Was an AbEx Pioneer," The New York Sun, May 29, 2008.
 Diana Manister, "Milton Resnick, Understanding Eden," Artezine.com, May 1, 2004.
 Phong Bui, "Milton Resnick Remembered," The Brooklyn Rail, April 1, 2004.
 Roberta Smith, "Milton Resnick, Abstract Expressionist Painter, Dies at 87, The New York Times, March 19, 2004.
 Rachel Youens, "Milton Resnick at Robert Miller Gallery," The Brooklyn Rail, May 1, 2001.
 

1917 births
2004 suicides
20th-century American painters
20th-century American male artists
21st-century American painters
21st-century American male artists
American male painters
American people of Ukrainian-Jewish descent
Abstract expressionist artists
Jews from the Russian Empire
Ukrainian Jews
White Russian emigrants to the United States
Jewish American artists
People from Vinnytsia Oblast
People from Bratslavsky Uyezd
Suicides in New York City
Works Progress Administration workers
20th-century American Jews
21st-century American Jews